Andera-ye Olya (also Romanized as Anderā-ye ‘Olyā; also known as Andarā, Andarā’, Anderā, and Indru) is a village in Madvarat Rural District, in the Central District of Shahr-e Babak County, Kerman Province, Iran. At the 2006 census, its population was 144, in 39 families.

References 

Populated places in Shahr-e Babak County